Deymeh may refer to:
 Deymeh, Chaharmahal and Bakhtiari
 Deymeh, Kurdistan
 Deymeh Darb
 Deymeh Kamar
 Deymeh-ye Dagher
 Deymeh-ye Kuchek
 Deymeh-ye Yaqub

See also
 Dimeh (disambiguation)